The 1901 Challenge Cup was the 5th staging of rugby league's oldest knockout competition, the Challenge Cup. Contested during the 1900–01 Northern Rugby Football Union season, the final was played between Batley and Warrington at Headingley Stadium in Leeds.

First round

Second round

Third round

Quarterfinals

Semifinals

Final
The final was played on Saturday 27 April 1901, where Batley beat Warrington 16-8 at Headingley in front of a crowd of 29,563.

References

External links
Challenge Cup official website 
Challenge Cup 1900/01 results at Rugby League Project
Warrington Wolves Heritage Numbers 1-300 at Warrington Guardian

Challenge Cup
Challenge Cup